Clarence R. Smith was a Structures Design Specialist in the Fatigue Laboratory at General Dynamics/Convair.

Education 
Smith studied physics at Stanford University.

Research and career 
Smith joined Convair in 1941, working extensively in the area of fatigue with a focus on aluminum aircraft structures. He contributed work on fatigue in support of the US Air Force, US Navy, and NASA. Smith was an early adopter of photoelasticity to determining stress concentrations due to notches, corner fillets, and holes in materials. He was an active member if the Society for Experimental Stress Analysis (later the Society for Experimental Mechanics) serving on the Executive Committee from 1953 to 1955, and the American Society for Testing Materials. He was the second recipient of the SESA Tatnall award after Frank Tatnall.

Awards and recognition 
Society for Experimental Mechanics Tatnall (1969)
Society for Experimental Mechanics Fellow (1976)

References 

American engineers
Stanford University alumni
Fellows of the Society for Experimental Mechanics
20th-century American engineers